Bical is a white Portuguese wine grape planted primarily in the Bairrada region. It can produce high acid wines and is often used in sparkling wine production.

Synonyms
Bical is also known under the synonyms Arinto de Alcobaça, Barrado das Moscas, Bical de Bairrada, Borrado das Moscas (in the Dao), Pintado das Moscas, and Pintado dos Pardais. Bical and Bical Tinto are also used as synonyms for Touriga Nacional.

See also
List of Portuguese grape varieties

References

White wine grape varieties